Yann-Alexandre Fillion (born February 14, 1996) is a Canadian professional soccer player who plays for HFX Wanderers of the Canadian Premier League.

Early life
Fillion was born in Ottawa, Ontario. After originally playing youth soccer in Ottawa with Gloucester Hornets and Capital United, he later moved to AS Hull in Quebec. In January 2013, Fillion joined the Montreal Impact Academy, after completing a couple of trials.

Club career 
In March 2015, Fillion joined the Impact's second team FC Montreal in the USL for their inaugural season. He made his professional debut for the club on March 28 in a 2–0 defeat to Toronto FC II.

In early 2016, he went to Switzerland to trial with Swiss Super League club FC Zürich, being invited back before signing a five year contract in May 2016. An injury early in his time in Switzerland, limited his integration into the first team. In February 2017, Fillion was loaned to Swedish Division 1 club Umeå FC for the 2017 season, departing after the season when his loan was not extended. In April 2018, he was loaned to Norwegian second tier side Nest-Sotra for the 2018 season. In July 2018, he was loaned to FC Aarau of the Swiss Challenge League. In March 2019, he joined Toronto FC II in USL League One on loan.

In December 2019, it was announced that Fillion signed with Ekenäs IF of the Ykkönen for the 2020 season on a free transfer. He finished the 2020 season with the second highest Instat rating amongst goalkeepers in the league with a 220 rating.

In December 2020, he joined Veikkausliiga club AC Oulu on a one year contract for the 2021 season with an option for a second year. He was an important figure for the team making several key saves throughout the season. He departed the club after one season.

In November 2021, he signed with Veikkausliiga club IFK Mariehamn for one season with an option for another year.

In January 2023, he signed with the HFX Wanderers in the Canadian Premier League. He turned down other offers in Europe, in order to join the Wanderers.

References

External links
 

1996 births
Living people
Association football goalkeepers
Canadian soccer players
Soccer players from Ottawa
Franco-Ontarian people
Canadian expatriate soccer players
Expatriate footballers in Switzerland
Canadian expatriate sportspeople in Switzerland
Expatriate footballers in Sweden
Canadian expatriate sportspeople in Sweden
Expatriate footballers in Norway
Canadian expatriate sportspeople in Norway
Expatriate footballers in Finland
Canadian expatriate sportspeople in Finland
CF Montréal players
FC Montreal players
FC Zürich players
Umeå FC players
Nest-Sotra Fotball players
FC Aarau players
Toronto FC II players
Ekenäs IF players
IFK Mariehamn players
USL Championship players
Ettan Fotboll players
Norwegian First Division players
Swiss Challenge League players
USL League One players
Ykkönen players
Veikkausliiga players